The Supersport 300 World Championship is a motorcycle racing competition on paved surfaces, for production-based motorcycles. Created in 2017, the championship runs as a support class to the Superbike World Championship.

History
The Supersport 300 World Championship was born in 2017 as a replacement for the European Junior Cup and European Superstock 600 Championship category that worked as a hotbed of the future stars of Superbike until 2016, this new championship has world-class status by the FIM. Like its predecessor, the championship runs alongside the World Superbike Championship and the Supersport World Championship but only in European rounds.

The objective of this category is to create a ladder to Superbike in an accessible way and with a mechanical equality that allows all the drivers to have the same winning options. The championship began on April 2, 2017 at MotorLand Aragón, in a race that had 37 drivers who crowned Scott Deroue as the first driver to win a race in category 3. Spaniard Marc García was the first Supersport 300 world champion to overcome the Italian Alfonso Coppola by one point.

On September 30, 2018, Ana Carrasco, who had been a year earlier the first woman to win a world championship race organized by FIM, became the first female champion of the world in the history of motorcycle racing.

On 2019 season, in order to face the big entry list (caused by the success of previous edition), FIM split Practice and Qualifying into 2 groups with best 30 riders racing on Sunday. The series has been noted for its close competition, which has been criticised as dangerous due to the risk of riders striking each other in the event of falls.

Regulations 
According to the regulation approved by the International Motorcycling Federation, drivers must be at least fifteen years of age to participate. Despite being a world championship, it never ran outside Europe at the moment.

The bikes allowed to run in this category are not exclusively 300 engine capacity, which is why the minimum weight and revolutions per minute vary for each motorcycle model.

Starting from the Aragon GP 2018 the limits imposed by the FIM are the following:

 KTM RC 390 R, single cylinder, minimum weight 136 kg, limit revolutions per minute 10.450 RPM
 Yamaha YZF-R3, twin-cylinder, minimum weight 140 kg, limit revolutions per minute 13,100 RPM
 Kawasaki Ninja 400, twin cylinder, minimum weight 150 kg, limit revolutions per minute 10,850 RPM
 Honda CBR500R, twin cylinder, minimum weight 143 kg, limit revolutions per minute 11,200 RPM

Champions

Riders' championship

Manufacturers' championship

References 

 
Motorcycle road racing series
Fédération Internationale de Motocyclisme
World Championship
World motorcycle racing series